Bareh Tork (also Romanized as Berah Tarak) is a village in Boluran Rural District, Darb-e Gonbad District, Kuhdasht County, Lorestan Province, Iran. At the 2006 census, its population was 161, in 32 families.

References 

Towns and villages in Kuhdasht County